The Bulgaria women's national football team represents Bulgaria in international women's football, and is controlled by the Bulgarian Football Union. The team's major success came in 2008 when they won the Balkan Championship and the Albena Cup in the same year. These major tournament victories brought them up to their all-time highest FIFA world ranking of 33rd.

History

Team image

Nicknames
The Bulgaria women's national football team have been nicknamed as "Лъвиците (The Lionesses)".

Home stadium
Bulgaria plays their home matches on the Lovech Stadium.

Results and fixtures

The following is a list of match results in the last 12 months, as well as any future matches that have been scheduled.

Legend

2022

2023

Coaching staff

Current coaching staff

Manager history

Players

Current squad
 The following 23 players were called up for the 2023 Turkish Women's Cup.
 Match dates: 15–21 February 2023
 Opposition: ,  and

Recent call-ups
The following players have been called up to a Bulgaria squad in the past 12 months.

Captains

Radoslava Slavcheva (????–)

Records

Active players in bold, statistics correct as of 2021.

Most capped players

Top goalscorers

Competitive record

FIFA Women's World Cup

*Draws include knockout matches decided on penalty kicks.

UEFA Women's Championship

*Draws include knockout matches decided on penalty kicks.

Honours
Albena Cup
 Champions : 2008
Balkan Cup
 Champions : 2008

See also
Sport in Bulgaria
Football in Bulgaria
Women's football in Bulgaria
Bulgaria men's national football team

References

External links
Official website 
FIFA profile

 
European women's national association football teams
national